Leslie Shatz is an American sound engineer. He was nominated for an Academy Award in the category Best Sound for the film The Mummy. He has worked on more than 180 films since 1971.

Selected filmography
 Milk
 Twilight
 Wendy and Lucy
 The Assassination of Jesse James by the Coward Robert Ford (2007)
 I'm Not There (2007)
 Paranoid Park (2007)
 Sahara (2005)
 Around the World in 80 Days
 Hidalgo (2004)
 Van Helsing (2004)
 Elephant (2003)
 The Count of Monte Cristo (2002)
 Far from Heaven (2002)
 The Mummy Returns (2001)
 Finding Forrester (2000)
 In Dreams (1999)
 The Mummy (1999)
 Alien: Resurrection (1997)
 Good Will Hunting (1997)
 Scream (1996)
 Johnny Mnemonic (1995)
 Judge Dredd (1995)
 Bram Stoker's Dracula (1992)
 Rambling Rose (1991)
 Ghost (1990)
 Henry & June''' (1990)
 The War of the Roses (1989)
 The Journey of Natty Gann (1985)
 Remo Williams: The Adventure Begins'' (1985)

References

External links

Year of birth missing (living people)
Living people
American audio engineers